State Road 207 (SR 207) is a four-lane state highway in northeast Florida, extending from US 17 in East Palatka, Florida at the southwest end to US 1 in St. Augustine, Florida at the northeastern end.

Route description
State Road 207 begins at US 17 in East Palatka, and heads northeast through Putnam County, going through the community of Orange Mills.  SR 207 then enters St. Johns County, passing through Hastings before intersecting SR 206 in Spuds.  SR 207 continues northeast, passing through the communities of Armstrong, Elkton, and Vermont Heights before entering St. Augustine, where SR 207 remains for the rest of its journey.  It then intersects Interstate 95, slowly heading into the heart of the city, intersecting SR 312 before terminating at US 1.

SR 207 mainly goes through farming area. The Seminole Electric power plant, and the Georgia Pacific paper mill in Putnam County along the St. Johns River can be seen from the road.

Much of the road includes crossings and trailheads for the Palatka-to-St. Augustine State Trail, including a trailhead on a former segment of the road in Elkton.

Major intersections

References

207
207
207